The 1965 New Zealand Labour Party leadership election was held on 9 December 1965 to determine the future leadership of the New Zealand Labour Party. The election was won by  MP Norman Kirk.

Background 
After Walter Nash retired as leader in 1963 Arnold Nordmeyer became Labour's sixth leader despite holding considerable public blame for Labour's loss of support after the Black Budget. The memory of the "Black Budget" still plagued Nordmeyer's profile and many within the party believed that it was time for a fresh start. Many MPs in Labour felt Nordmeyer was unelectable as his previous performance as Minister of Finance represented a 'tax and hope' image which the party was keen to rectify. In early 1964 Kirk spoke to Nordmeyer to see if he intended to continue as party leader. Nordmeyer stated he did and was confident he would win the 1966 election and would appoint Kirk Minister of Industries and Commerce in the event of a Labour victory. Kirk thought this hypothetical posting to be insufficient and set his sights on the leadership, despite (according to Nordmeyer) promising he would not. Some colleagues such as Henry May thought it best for Kirk to wait until after the 1966 election, believing Labour would lose regardless of who was leader. Kirk ignored such advice and, as party president, strategically allowed full television coverage of the party's 1965 annual conference. It was the first occasion a political conference was televised and Kirk took full advantage and presented himself well on camera and made impressive speeches including deliberately straying in his 'state of the party' address to speak on foreign affairs and declare reasons why New Zealand should avoid participating in the Vietnam War.

In 1965 a group of younger Labour MPs formed a group who became dedicated to replace Nordmeyer with Kirk, becoming known as the "Mafia". The main supporters of Kirk were Bill Fox, Warren Freer and Mick Moohan who promoted him to others at gatherings. Moohan attempted to win over the President of the New Zealand Federation of Labour Tom Skinner, who was unconvinced. Skinner respected rather than liked Nordmeyer but thought a challenge being the end of his leadership was less dignified than he deserved and refused to help Kirk. Freer, who supported Kirk but also felt affinity for Nordmeyer, asked his friend Phil Holloway (a Labour MP from 1954 to 1960) to inform Nordmeyer of Kirk's level of support. Freer hoped that if Nordmeyer was aware of the numbers he would not contest the leadership and save himself embarrassment. At a dinner with the Nordmeyers, Holloway informed them of the state of caucus loyalties. Nordmeyer was shocked to hear of Kirk's support but his wife, Frances, was cynical of the news and dismissed the information and assured that her husband had the numbers to win.

Candidates

Arnold Nordmeyer  
Nordmeyer had led Labour since Nash's retirement nearly three years earlier. He led them in the 1963 election where Labour's vote increased slightly, but still did not perform well enough to win office. Some within Labour's caucus were of the opinion that Nordmeyer was too distant and out of touch with his colleagues and vice versa. The younger Norman Kirk eventually emerged as the favourite candidate to succeed Nordmeyer as leader.

Norman Kirk 
Kirk first entered parliament in 1957. Gradually, he began to rise through Labour's internal hierarchy, becoming vice-president of the Party in 1963 and president in 1964. Other MPs often saw Kirk as a champion for ordinary New Zealanders via his working-class background at a time when ordinary voters saw many other politicians, such as Nordmeyer, out-of-touch and aloof.

Result
A caucus vote was held on 9 December 1965 where Nordmeyer was defeated by Kirk 25 votes to 10. Nordmeyer's deputy leader, Hugh Watt, retained his position despite the change in leadership receiving 24 votes against a combined total of 10 votes for the other two nominees.

Leadership ballot

Deputy-leadership ballot

How each MP voted
A list of each MP's vote.

Aftermath 

Kirk's new enthusiastic leadership brought about a gradual rejuvenation in Labour's popularity. He suffered narrow election losses in 1966 and 1969 elections before finally winning office and becoming Prime Minister in 1972 election. Nordmeyer remained in Parliament for another four years, moving to the backbenches and becoming an elder statesman of the party. He retired at the 1969 election.

Notes

References

Labour Party leadership
1965
Indirect elections
December 1965 events in New Zealand
New Zealand Labour Party leadership election